Bố Trạch is a rural district in Quảng Bình province. The district capital is Hoàn Lão township. Bố Trạch borders the capital city of Đồng Hới to the south-east, Tuyên Hóa district and Quảng Trạch district to the north, Quảng Ninh district to the south and Minh Hóa district to the north-west. Bố Trạch is home to Phong Nha-Kẻ Bàng National Park and has 30 communes and townships. As of 2017 the district had a population of 184,371.

Administrative divisions
The district is divided into 3 townships: Hoàn Lão, Phong Nha and Nông Trường Việt Trung, and 25 rural communes: Bắc Trạch, Cự Nẫm, Đại Trạch, Đồng Trạch, Đức Trạch, Hạ Trạch, Hải Phú, Hoà Trạch, Hưng Trạch, Lâm Trạch, Liên Trạch, Lý Trạch, Mỹ Trạch, Nam Trạch, Nhân Trạch, Phú Định, Phúc Trạch, Sơn Lộc, Tân Trạch, Tây Trạch, Thanh Trạch, Thượng Trạch, Trung Trạch, Vạn Trạch and Xuân Trạch.

Area and population of administrative units of Bố Trạch district (figures from annual census of Bố Trạch district of 2006)

References

Districts of Quảng Bình province